Kelvin Ofori (born 27 July 2001) is a Ghanaian professional footballer who plays as an attacking midfielder for Slovak club Spartak Trnava.

Career

Early career
Ofori first played for the Right to Dream Academy from 2011 to 2019.

Fortuna Düsseldorf
Following a successful trial at Bundesliga club Fortuna Düsseldorf, Ofori signed a three-year deal with the club.

His first competitive appearance for Fortuna Düsseldorf came as a substitute in a DFB-Pokal match against FC 08 Villingen, in which he scored his first goal at professional level. He also made his Bundesliga debut as a substitute in a match against Mainz 05, replacing Valon Berisha in the 79th minute.

SC Paderborn
On 11 August 2021, Ofori signed a two-year contract with SC Paderborn 07 of the 2. Bundesliga. Four days later, on 15 August, he made his league debut for the club by coming on as a substitute in a 4–1 win at Werder Bremen. On 24 April 2022, he scored the final goal in a 3–0 win at home to Hannover 96. Eventually, it proved to be his only goal for Paderborn. He made a total of 15 league appearances for the club, mostly as a substitute.

Spartak Trnava
On 3 February 2023, it was confirmed that Ofori had joined Spartak Trnava of the Slovak First Division, signing a contract for two and a half years. He made his debut for the club on 11 February 2023 by being in the starting line-up for their first league match after the winter break, a 2–1 win at Tatran Liptovský Mikuláš.

References

2001 births
Living people
Ghanaian footballers
Association football forwards
Bundesliga players
2. Bundesliga players
Fortuna Düsseldorf players
SC Paderborn 07 players
FC Spartak Trnava players
Ghanaian expatriate footballers
Ghanaian expatriate sportspeople in Germany
Expatriate footballers in Germany
Ghanaian expatriate sportspeople in Slovakia
Expatriate footballers in Slovakia